Mazeed Ogungbo (born 20 October 2002) is an Irish professional footballer who plays as a defender for Crawley Town, on loan from Arsenal.

Club career
Ogungbo began his career with Arsenal, joining their academy at the age of 13, and turning professional in August 2021. He joined Crawley Town on loan from Arsenal in August 2022.

International career
Ogungbo is an Irish youth international. He is also eligible to play for Nigeria.

Career statistics

References

2002 births
Living people
Republic of Ireland association footballers
Republic of Ireland youth international footballers
Irish people of Nigerian descent
Arsenal F.C. players
Crawley Town F.C. players
English Football League players
Association football defenders
Black Irish sportspeople